IROC XX was the twentieth season of IROC competition, which started on February 16, 1996. It was the first year that the Pontiac Firebird Trans Am was used in competition, and contested races at Daytona International Speedway, Talladega Superspeedway, Charlotte Motor Speedway, and Michigan International Speedway. Mark Martin won the first night race in the history of the series in race three at Charlotte Motor Speedway, and won again in the season finale at Michigan International Speedway to win $225,000 in a come-from-behind IROC championship, his second in three seasons.

The roster of drivers and final points standings were as follows:

Race results

Daytona International Speedway, Race One

 Dale Earnhardt
 Robby Gordon
 Tommy Kendall
 Sterling Marlin
 Al Unser Jr.
 Jeff Gordon
 Terry Labonte
 Mark Martin
 Johnny Benson
 Scott Pruett
 Steve Kinser
 Rusty Wallace

Talladega Superspeedway, Race Two

 Al Unser Jr.
 Robby Gordon
 Scott Pruett
 Sterling Marlin
 Terry Labonte
 Steve Kinser
 Jeff Gordon
 Tommy Kendall
 Dale Earnhardt
 Johnny Benson
 Mark Martin
 Rusty Wallace

Charlotte Motor Speedway, Race Three

 Mark Martin
 Johnny Benson
 Scott Pruett
 Rusty Wallace
 Jeff Gordon
 Terry Labonte
 Tommy Kendall
 Al Unser Jr.
 Steve Kinser
 Dale Earnhardt
 Sterling Marlin
 Robby Gordon

Michigan International Speedway, Race Four

 Mark Martin
 Johnny Benson
 Terry Labonte
 Robby Gordon
 Al Unser Jr.
 Sterling Marlin
 Rusty Wallace
 Scott Pruett
 Dale Jarrett 1
 Ricky Rudd 2
 Geoff Bodine3
 Jeff Gordon

Notes
 Dale Jarrett drove for Steve Kinser
 Ricky Rudd drove for Dale Earnhardt, who was injured in a Cup race at Talladega the week before.
 Geoff Bodine drove for Tommy Kendall

References

External links
IROC XIX History - IROC Website

International Race of Champions
1996 in American motorsport